The 351st Operations Group is an inactive unit of the United States Air Force. Its last assignment was with the 351st Missile Wing at Whiteman Air Force Base, Missouri. It was inactivated on 31 July 1995.

History
 For additional history and lineage, see 351st Missile Wing

Strategic Missiles
Activated as the 351st Operations Group on 1 September 1991 under the Objective Wing concept adapted by the Air Force. The ICBM squadrons of the renamed 351st Missile Wing were reassigned to the newly established group.

On 28 September 1991, in response to President Bush's directive to stand down the Minuteman II, personnel of the 351 OG began to dissipate launch codes and pin safety control switches at launch control centers.

On 1 June 1992, the 351 OG was relieved of its emergency war order mission and its primary focus was deactivation of the Minuteman II weapon system. This day also marked the end of SAC and the beginning of Air Combat Command (ACC).

On 1 July 1993 its parent unit, the 351 MW changed hands from ACC to Air Force Space Command along with all other ICBM wings. The 508th, 509th and 510th Missile Squadrons were inactivated along with the 351st Operations Group on 31 July 1995.

Lineage
 Constituted as the 351st Operations Group on 29 August 1991
 Activated on 1 September 1991
 Inactivated on 31 July 1995

Assignments
 351st Missile Wing, 1 September 1991 – 31 July 1995

Components
 351st Operations Support Squadron, 1 September 1991 – 31 July 1995
 508th Missile Squadron, 1 September 1991 – 31 July 1995
 509th Missile Squadron, 1 September 1991 – 31 July 1995
 510th Missile Squadron, 1 September 1991 – 31 July 1995

Stations
 Whiteman Air Force Base, Missouri, 1 September 1991 – 31 July 1995

Aircraft and missiles
 LGM-30F Minuteman II, 1991–1995

References

External links

Military units and formations established in 1991
Operations groups of the United States Air Force
1991 establishments in the United States